James Langley Dalton VC (1833 – 7 January 1887) was an English recipient of the Victoria Cross, the highest and most prestigious award for gallantry in the face of the enemy that can be awarded to British and Commonwealth forces for service at the Battle of Rorke's Drift during the Anglo-Zulu War.

Military career
Born in London in 1833, Dalton enlisted in 85th Regiment of Foot in November 1849 at the age of 17.  In 1862 he transferred to the Commissariat Corps at the rank of corporal, and was promoted to sergeant in 1863, and clerk and staff sergeant in 1867. He served with Sir Garnet Wolseley on the Red River Expedition in Canada in 1870, retiring from the army the next year. By 1877, he was living in South Africa and volunteered for service as Acting Assistant Commissary with the British Force.

Victoria Cross
Dalton was approximately 46 years old, and an acting assistant commissary in the Commissariat and Transport Department (later Royal Army Service Corps), British Army during the Anglo-Zulu War when he was awarded the VC for his actions on 22 January 1879, at Rorke's Drift, Natal, South Africa.

His citation in the London Gazette of 17 November 1879 reads:

Dalton was not originally named among the VC recipients, eventually receiving his VC from General Hugh Clifford, VC at a special parade at Fort Napier on 16 January 1880.

Death and legacy
Dalton died in Port Elizabeth, South Africa. He is buried in the Russell Road Roman Catholic Cemetery with a memorial, Plot E. The precise location of his grave is 33° 57' 37" S 25° 36' 53" E.

The barracks in Haverfordwest, Pembrokeshire, is named "The Dalton VC Centre" after him. Dalton Barracks, Abingdon, previously RAF Abingdon, also bears his name.

His Victoria Cross is displayed at the Royal Logistic Corps Museum in Worthy Down, Winchester.

References

External links
James Langley Dalton (biography, photos, memorial details)
Rorke's Drift (information within Frederick Hitch site)

1833 births
1887 deaths
Anglo-Zulu War recipients of the Victoria Cross
People of the Red River Rebellion
British recipients of the Victoria Cross
Royal Army Service Corps officers
King's Shropshire Light Infantry soldiers
Royal Army Service Corps soldiers
British Army personnel of the Anglo-Zulu War
British Army recipients of the Victoria Cross
British Army Commissariat officers
Military personnel from London